{{Speciesbox
| image = CelastrinaPhilippinaCinctutaMUpUnAC1.jpg
| image_caption = 
| taxon = Celastrina philippina
| authority = (Semper, 1889) <ref>Semper, G., 1886-1892. Die Schmetterlinge der Philippinischen Inseln, Beitrag zur Indo-Malayischen Lepidopteren-Fauna (Die Tagfalter). Vol.l: 380pp, 49 pls. In C. G. Semper, Reisen im Archipen der Philippinen.., (2)5. Weisbaden.</ref> 
}} Celastrina philippina'' is a small butterfly found in the Indomalayan realm and which crosses the Wallace Line into  the Australasian realm  that belongs to the lycaenids or blues family.

References

philippina
Butterflies described in 1889